Bruland is a farming village located about  east of the town of Førde in the municipality of Sunnfjord in Vestland county, Norway. The population (2001) of Bruland was 212. It is located just south of the river Jølstra, along the European route E39 highway. The name of the hamlet, Bruland literally means "land of bridges". Historically, many of the people who worked on the local farm took the surname Bruland.

Bruland was the home of the bailiff or Fogd for the whole Sunnfjord region from 1567 until the end of the nineteenth century. One of the farm buildings at Bruland was moved there from the island of Svanøya (in Flora municipality) in 1789.  Many of the old buildings have been restored and are now protected.

Notable people
Dagny Juel (1867–1901)

References

Villages in Vestland
Sunnfjord